Naturally occurring silver (47Ag) is composed of the two stable isotopes 107Ag and 109Ag in almost equal proportions, with 107Ag being slightly more abundant (51.839% natural abundance). 40 radioisotopes have been characterized with the most stable being 105Ag with a half-life of 41.29 days, 111Ag with a half-life of 7.43 days, and 112Ag with a half-life of 3.13 hours.

All of the remaining radioactive isotopes have half-lives that are less than an hour, and the majority of these have half-lives that are less than 3 minutes. This element has numerous meta states, with the most stable being 108mAg (half-life 439 years), 110mAg (half-life 249.86 days) and 106mAg (half-life 8.28 days).

Isotopes of silver range in atomic weight from 91.960 u (92Ag) to 132.969 u (133Ag). The primary decay mode before the most abundant stable isotope, 107Ag, is electron capture and the primary mode after is beta decay. The primary decay products before 107Ag are palladium (element 46) isotopes and the primary products after are cadmium (element 48) isotopes.

The palladium isotope 107Pd decays by beta emission to 107Ag with a half-life of 6.5 million years. Iron meteorites are the only objects with a high enough palladium/silver ratio to yield measurable variations in 107Ag abundance. Radiogenic 107Ag was first discovered in the Santa Clara meteorite in 1978.

The discoverers suggest that the coalescence and differentiation of iron-cored small planets may have occurred 10 million years after a nucleosynthetic event. 107Pd versus 107Ag correlations observed in bodies, which have clearly been melted since the accretion of the Solar System, must reflect the presence of live short-lived nuclides in the early Solar System.

List of isotopes 

|-
| rowspan=2 | 92Ag
| rowspan=2 | 47
| rowspan=2 | 45
| rowspan=2 | 91.95971(43)#
| rowspan=2|1# ms[>400 ns]
| β+ 
| 92Pd
| rowspan=2|
| rowspan=2|
| rowspan=2|
|- 
| p 
| 91Pd
|-
| rowspan=3 | 93Ag
| rowspan=3 | 47
| rowspan=3 | 46
| rowspan=3 | 92.95019(43)#
| rowspan=3| 228(16) ns
| β+ 
| 93Pd
| rowspan=3|9/2+#
| rowspan=3|
| rowspan=3| 
|-
| p 
| 92Pd
|-
| β+, p
| 92Rh
|-
| rowspan=2| 94Ag
| rowspan=2 style="text-align:right" | 47
| rowspan=2 style="text-align:right" | 47
| rowspan=2| 93.94374(43)#
| rowspan=2| 27(2) ms
| β+ (>99.8%)
| 94Pd
| rowspan=2| 0+#
| rowspan=2| 
| rowspan=2| 
|-
| β+, p (<0.2%)
| 93Rh 
|-
| rowspan=2 style="text-indent:1em" | 94m1Ag
| rowspan=2 colspan="3" style="text-indent:2em" | 1350(400)# keV
| rowspan=2|470(10) ms
| β+ (83%)
| 94Pd
| rowspan=2|(7+)
| rowspan=2|
| rowspan=2| 
|-
| β+, p (17%)
| 93Rh
|-
| rowspan=4 style="text-indent:1em" | 94m2Ag
| rowspan=4 colspan="3" style="text-indent:2em" | 6500(550)# keV
| rowspan=4| 400(40) ms
| β+ (~68.4%)
| 94Pd
| rowspan=4| (21+)
| rowspan=4|
| rowspan=4|
|-
| β+, p (~27%)
| 93Rh
|-
| p (4.1%)
| 93Pd
|-
| 2p (0.5%)
| 92Rh
|-
| rowspan=2|95Ag
| rowspan=2 style="text-align:right" | 47
| rowspan=2 style="text-align:right" | 48
| rowspan=2|94.93569(43)#
| rowspan=2|1.78(6) s
| β+ (97.7%)
| 95Pd
| rowspan=2|(9/2+)
| rowspan=2|
| rowspan=2|
|-
| β+, p (2.3%)
| 94Rh
|-
| style="text-indent:1em" | 95m1Ag
| colspan="3" style="text-indent:2em" | 344.2(3) keV
| <0.5 s
| IT
| 95Ag
| (1/2−)
|
|
|-
| style="text-indent:1em" | 95m2Ag
| colspan="3" style="text-indent:2em" | 2531.3(15) keV
| <16 ms
| IT
| 95Ag
| (23/2+)
|
|
|-
| style="text-indent:1em" | 95m3Ag
| colspan="3" style="text-indent:2em" | 4860.0(15) keV
| <40 ms
| IT
| 95Ag
| (37/2+)
|
|
|-
| rowspan=2|96Ag
| rowspan=2 style="text-align:right" | 47
| rowspan=2 style="text-align:right" | 49
| rowspan=2|95.93074(10) 
| rowspan=2|4.45(3) s
| β+ (95.8%)
| 96Pd
| rowspan=2|(8+)
| rowspan=2|
| rowspan=2|
|-
| β+, p (4.2%)
| 95Rh
|-
| rowspan=2 style="text-indent:1em" | 96m1Ag
| rowspan=2 colspan="3" style="text-indent:2em" | 0(50)# keV
| rowspan=2| 6.9(5) s
| β+ (85.1%)
| 96Pd
| rowspan=2| (2+)
| rowspan=2|
| rowspan=2|
|-
| β+, p (14.9%)
| 95Rh
|-
| style="text-indent:1em" | 96m2Ag
| colspan="3" style="text-indent:2em" | 2461.4(3) keV
| 103.2(45) μs
| IT
| 96Ag
| (13-)
|
|
|-
| style="text-indent:1em" | 96m3Ag
| colspan="3" style="text-indent:2em" | 2686.7(4) keV
| 1.561(16) μs
| IT
| 96Ag
| (15+)
|
|
|-
| style="text-indent:1em" | 96m4Ag
| colspan="3" style="text-indent:2em" | 6951.8(14) keV
| 132(17) ns
| IT
| 96Ag
| (19+)
|
|
|-
| 97Ag
| style="text-align:right" | 47
| style="text-align:right" | 50
| 96.923881(13)
| 25.5(3) s
| β+
| 97Pd
| (9/2+)
|
|
|-
| style="text-indent:1em" | 97mAg
| colspan="3" style="text-indent:2em" | 620(40) keV
| 100# ms
|
|
| (1/2-#)
|
|
|-
| rowspan=2|98Ag
| rowspan=2 style="text-align:right" | 47
| rowspan=2 style="text-align:right" | 51
| rowspan=2|97.92156(4)
| rowspan=2|47.5(3) s
| β+ (99.99%)
| 98Pd
| rowspan=2|(6)+
| rowspan=2|
| rowspan=2|
|-
| β+, p (.0012%)
| 97Rh
|-
| style="text-indent:1em" | 98mAg
| colspan="3" style="text-indent:2em" | 107.28(10) keV
| 161(7) ns
| IT
| 98Ag
| (4+)
|
|
|-
| 99Ag
| style="text-align:right" | 47
| style="text-align:right" | 52
| 98.917646(7)
| 2.07(5) min
| β+
| 99Pd
| (9/2)+
|
|
|-
| style="text-indent:1em" | 99mAg
| colspan="3" style="text-indent:2em" | 506.2(4) keV
| 10.5(5) s
| IT
| 99Ag
| (1/2−)
|
|
|-
| 100Ag
| style="text-align:right" | 47
| style="text-align:right" | 53
| 99.916115(5)
| 2.01(9) min
| β+
| 100Pd
| (5)+
| 
| 
|-
| rowspan=2 style="text-indent:1em" | 100mAg
| rowspan=2 colspan="3" style="text-indent:2em" | 15.52(16) keV
| rowspan=2|2.24(13) min
| IT
| 100Ag
| rowspan=2|(2)+
| rowspan=2|
| rowspan=2|
|-
| β+ 
| 100Pd 
|-
| 101Ag
| style="text-align:right" | 47
| style="text-align:right" | 54
| 100.912684(5)
| 11.1(3) min
| β+
| 101Pd
| 9/2+
|
|
|-
| style="text-indent:1em" | 101mAg
| colspan="3" style="text-indent:2em" | 274.1(3) keV
| 3.10(10) s
| IT
| 101Ag
| 1/2−
|
|
|-
| 102Ag
| style="text-align:right" | 47
| style="text-align:right" | 55
| 101.911705(9)
| 12.9(3) min
| β+
| 102Pd
| 5+
|
|
|-
| rowspan=2 style="text-indent:1em" | 102mAg
| rowspan=2 colspan="3" style="text-indent:2em" | 9.40(7) keV
| rowspan=2|7.7(5) min
| β+ (51%)
| 102Pd
| rowspan=2|2+
| rowspan=2|
| rowspan=2|
|-
| IT (49%)
| 102Ag
|-
| 103Ag
| style="text-align:right" | 47
| style="text-align:right" | 56
| 102.908961(4)
| 65.7(7) min
| β+
| 103Pd
| 7/2+
|
|
|-
| style="text-indent:1em" | 103mAg
| colspan="3" style="text-indent:2em" | 134.45(4) keV
| 5.7(3) s
| IT
| 103Ag
| 1/2−
|
|
|-
| 104Ag
| style="text-align:right" | 47
| style="text-align:right" | 57
| 103.908624(5)
| 69.2(10) min
| β+
| 104Pd
| 5+
|
|
|-
| rowspan=2 style="text-indent:1em" | 104mAg
| rowspan=2 colspan="3" style="text-indent:2em" | 6.90(22) keV
| rowspan=2|33.5(20) min
| β+ (>99.93%)
| 104Pd
| rowspan=2|2+
| rowspan=2|
| rowspan=2|
|-
| IT (<0.07%)
| 104Ag
|-
| 105Ag
| style="text-align:right" | 47
| style="text-align:right" | 58
| 104.906526(5)
| 41.29(7) d
| β+
| 105Pd
| 1/2−
|
|
|-
| rowspan=2 style="text-indent:1em" | 105mAg
| rowspan=2 colspan="3" style="text-indent:2em" | 25.468(16) keV
| rowspan=2|7.23(16) min
| IT (99.66%)
| 105Ag
| rowspan=2|7/2+
| rowspan=2|
| rowspan=2|
|-
| β+ (.34%)
| 105Pd
|-
| rowspan=2|106Ag
| rowspan=2 style="text-align:right" | 47
| rowspan=2 style="text-align:right" | 59
| rowspan=2|105.906663(3)
| rowspan=2|23.96(4) min
| β+ 
| 106Pd
| rowspan=2|1+
| rowspan=2|
| rowspan=2|
|-
| β− (rare)
| 106Cd
|-
| rowspan=2 style="text-indent:1em" | 106mAg
| rowspan=2 colspan="3" style="text-indent:2em" | 89.66(7) keV
| rowspan=2|8.28(2) d
| β+
| 106Pd
| rowspan=2|6+
| rowspan=2|
| rowspan=2|
|-
| IT (rare)
| 106Ag
|-
| 107Ag
| style="text-align:right" | 47
| style="text-align:right" | 60
| 106.9050915(26)
| colspan=3 align=center|Stable
| 1/2−
| 0.51839(8)
|
|-
| style="text-indent:1em" | 107mAg
| colspan="3" style="text-indent:2em" | 93.125(19) keV
| 44.3(2) s
| IT
| 107Ag
| 7/2+
|
|
|-
| rowspan=2|108Ag
| rowspan=2 style="text-align:right" | 47
| rowspan=2 style="text-align:right" | 61
| rowspan=2|107.9059502(26)
| rowspan=2|2.382(11) min
| β− (97.15%)
| 108Cd
| rowspan=2|1+
| rowspan=2|
| rowspan=2|
|-
| β+ (2.85%)
| 108Pd
|-
| rowspan=2 style="text-indent:1em" | 108mAg
| rowspan=2 colspan="3" style="text-indent:2em" | 109.466(7) keV
| rowspan=2|439(9) y
| β+ (91.3%)
| 108Pd
| rowspan=2|6+
| rowspan=2|
| rowspan=2|
|-
| IT (8.96%)
| 108Ag
|-
| 109Ag
| style="text-align:right" | 47
| style="text-align:right" | 62
| 108.9047558(14)
| colspan=3 align=center|Stable
| 1/2−
| 0.48161(8)
|
|-
| style="text-indent:1em" | 109mAg
| colspan="3" style="text-indent:2em" | 88.0337(10) keV
| 39.79(21) s
| IT
| 109Ag
| 7/2+
|
|
|-
| rowspan=2|110Ag
| rowspan=2 style="text-align:right" | 47
| rowspan=2 style="text-align:right" | 63
| rowspan=2|109.9061107(14)
| rowspan=2|24.56(11) s
| β− (99.7%)
| 110Cd
| rowspan=2|1+
| rowspan=2|
| rowspan=2|
|-
| EC (.3%)
| 110Pd
|-
| style="text-indent:1em" | 110m1Ag
| colspan="3" style="text-indent:2em" | 1.112(16) keV
| 660(40) ns
| IT
| 110Ag
| 2−
| 
| 
|-
| rowspan=2 style="text-indent:1em" | 110m2Ag
| rowspan=2 colspan="3" style="text-indent:2em" | 117.59(5) keV
| rowspan=2|249.863(24) d
| β− (98.67%)
| 110Cd
| rowspan=2|6+
| rowspan=2|
| rowspan=2|
|-
| IT (1.33%)
| 110Ag
|-
| 111Ag
| style="text-align:right" | 47
| style="text-align:right" | 64
| 110.9052968(16)
| 7.433(10) d
| β−
| 111Cd
| 1/2−
|
|
|-
| rowspan=2 style="text-indent:1em" | 111mAg
| rowspan=2 colspan="3" style="text-indent:2em" | 59.82(4) keV
| rowspan=2|64.8(8) s
| IT (99.3%)
| 111Ag
| rowspan=2|7/2+
| rowspan=2|
| rowspan=2|
|-
| β− (.7%)
| 111Cd
|-
| 112Ag
| style="text-align:right" | 47
| style="text-align:right" | 65
| 111.9070485(26)
| 3.130(8) h
| β−
| 112Cd
| 2(−)
|
|
|-
| 113Ag
| style="text-align:right" | 47
| style="text-align:right" | 66
| 112.906573(18)
| 5.37(5) h
| β−
| 113mCd
| 1/2−
|
|
|-
| rowspan=2 style="text-indent:1em" | 113mAg
| rowspan=2 colspan="3" style="text-indent:2em" | 43.50(10) keV
| rowspan=2|68.7(16) s
| IT (64%)
| 113Ag
| rowspan=2|7/2+
| rowspan=2|
| rowspan=2|
|-
| β− (36%)
| 113Cd
|-
| 114Ag
| style="text-align:right" | 47
| style="text-align:right" | 67
| 113.908823(5)
| 4.6(1) s
| β−
| 114Cd
| 1+
|
|
|-
| style="text-indent:1em" | 114mAg
| colspan="3" style="text-indent:2em" | 198.9(10) keV
| 1.50(5) ms
| IT
| 114Ag
| (6+)
|
|
|-
| 115Ag
| style="text-align:right" | 47
| style="text-align:right" | 68
| 114.908767(20)
| 20.0(5) min
| β−
| 115mCd
| 1/2−
|
|
|-
| rowspan=2 style="text-indent:1em" | 115mAg
| rowspan=2 colspan="3" style="text-indent:2em" | 41.16(10) keV
| rowspan=2|18.0(7) s
| β− (79%)
| 115Cd
| rowspan=2|7/2+
| rowspan=2|
| rowspan=2|
|-
| IT (21%)
| 115Ag
|-
| 116Ag
| style="text-align:right" | 47
| style="text-align:right" | 69
| 115.911387(4)
| 3.83(8) min
| β−
| 116Cd
| (0-)
|
|
|-
| rowspan=2 style="text-indent:1em" | 116m1Ag
| rowspan=2 colspan="3" style="text-indent:2em" | 47.90(10) keV
| rowspan=2|20(1) s
| β− (93%)
| 116Cd
| rowspan=2|(3+)
| rowspan=2|
| rowspan=2|
|-
| IT (7%)
| 116Ag
|-
| rowspan=2 style="text-indent:1em" | 116m2Ag
| rowspan=2 colspan="3" style="text-indent:2em" | 129.80(22) keV
| rowspan=2|9.3(3) s
| β− (92%)
| 116Cd
| rowspan=2|(6-)
| rowspan=2|
| rowspan=2|
|-
| IT (8%)
| 116Ag
|-
| 117Ag
| style="text-align:right" | 47
| style="text-align:right" | 70
| 116.911774(15)
| 73.6(14) s
| β−
| 117mCd
| 1/2−#
|
|
|-
| rowspan=2 style="text-indent:1em" | 117mAg
| rowspan=2 colspan="3" style="text-indent:2em" | 28.6(2) keV
| rowspan=2|5.34(5) s
| β− (94%)
| 117mCd
| rowspan=2|7/2+#
| rowspan=2|
| rowspan=2|
|-
| IT (6%)
| 117Ag
|-
| 118Ag
| style="text-align:right" | 47
| style="text-align:right" | 71
| 117.9145955(27)
| 3.76(15) s
| β−
| 118Cd
| (2-)
|
|
|-
| style="text-indent:1em" | 118m1Ag
| colspan="3" style="text-indent:2em" | 45.79(9) keV
| ~0.1 µs
| IT
| 118Ag
| 1(−) to 2(−)
|
|
|-
| rowspan=2 style="text-indent:1em" | 118m2Ag
| rowspan=2 colspan="3" style="text-indent:2em" | 127.63(10) keV
| rowspan=2|2.0(2) s
| β− (59%)
| 118Cd
| rowspan=2|(5+)
| rowspan=2|
| rowspan=2|
|-
| IT (41%)
| 118Ag
|-
| style="text-indent:1em" | 118m3Ag
| colspan="3" style="text-indent:2em" | 279.37(20) keV
| ~0.1 µs
| IT
| 118Ag
| (3+)
|
|
|-
| 119Ag
| style="text-align:right" | 47
| style="text-align:right" | 72
| 118.915570(16)
| 6.0(5) s
| β−
| 119mCd
| 1/2−#
|
|
|-
| style="text-indent:1em" | 119mAg
| colspan="3" style="text-indent:2em" | 20(20)# keV
| 2.1(1) s
| β−
| 119Cd
| 7/2+#
|
|
|-
| rowspan=2|120Ag
| rowspan=2 style="text-align:right" | 47
| rowspan=2 style="text-align:right" | 73
| rowspan=2|119.918785(5)
| rowspan=2|1.52(7) s
| β− (>99.997%)
| 120Cd
| rowspan=2|4(+)
| rowspan=2|
| rowspan=2|
|-
| β−, n (<.003%)
| 119Cd
|-
| style="text-indent:1em" | 120m1Ag
| colspan="3" style="text-indent:2em" | 0(50)# keV
| 940(100) ms
| 
| 
| (0−, 1-)
| 
| 
|-
| rowspan=2 style="text-indent:1em" | 120m2Ag
| rowspan=2 colspan="3" style="text-indent:2em" | 203.0(10) keV
| rowspan=2|384(22) ms
| IT (68%)
| 120Sn
| rowspan=2|7(−)
| rowspan=2|
| rowspan=2|
|-
| β− (32%)
| 120Cd
|-
| rowspan=2|121Ag
| rowspan=2 style="text-align:right" | 47
| rowspan=2 style="text-align:right" | 74
| rowspan=2|120.920125(13)
| rowspan=2|777(10) ms
| β− (99.92%)
| 121Cd
| rowspan=2|7/2+#
| rowspan=2| 
| rowspan=2|
|-
| β−, n (.076%)
| 120Cd
|-
| style="text-indent:1em" | 121mAg
| colspan="3" style="text-indent:2em" | 20(20)# keV
| 200# ms
| 
| 
| 1/2-#
| 
| 
|-
| rowspan=2|122Ag
| rowspan=2 style="text-align:right" | 47
| rowspan=2 style="text-align:right" | 75
| rowspan=2|121.92366(4)
| rowspan=2|529(13) ms
| β− (>99.814%)
| 122Cd
| rowspan=2|(3+)
| rowspan=2|
| rowspan=2|
|-
| β−, n (.186%)
| 121Cd
|-
| rowspan=3 style="text-indent:1em" | 122m1Ag
| rowspan=3 colspan="3" style="text-indent:2em" | 80(50)# keV
| rowspan=3|550(50) ms
| β− 
| 122Cd
| rowspan=3|(1-)
| rowspan=3|
| rowspan=3|
|-
| β−, n (rare)
| 121Cd
|-
| IT (rare)
| 122Ag
|-
| rowspan=3 style="text-indent:1em" | 122m2Ag
| rowspan=3 colspan="3" style="text-indent:2em" | 80(50)# keV
| rowspan=3|200(50) ms
| β− 
| 122Cd
| rowspan=3|(9-)
| rowspan=3|
| rowspan=3|
|-
| β−, n (rare)
| 121Cd
|-
| IT (rare)
| 122Ag
|-
| style="text-indent:1em" | 122m3Ag
| colspan="3" style="text-indent:2em" | 171(50)# keV
| 6.3(1) μs
| IT
| 122Ag
| (1+)
| 
| 
|-
| rowspan=2|123Ag
| rowspan=2 style="text-align:right" | 47
| rowspan=2 style="text-align:right" | 76
| rowspan=2|122.92532(4)
| rowspan=2|294(5) ms
| β− (99.44%)
| 123Cd
| rowspan=2|(7/2+)
| rowspan=2|
| rowspan=2|
|-
| β−, n (.56%)
| 122Cd
|-
| rowspan=2 style="text-indent:1em" | 123m1Ag
| rowspan=2 colspan="3" style="text-indent:2em" | 59.5(5) keV
| rowspan=2|100# ms
| β− 
| 123Cd
| rowspan=2|(1/2-)
| rowspan=2|
| rowspan=2|
|-
| β−, n (rare)
| 122Cd
|-
| style="text-indent:1em" | 123m2Ag
| colspan="3" style="text-indent:2em" | 1450(14)# keV
| 202(20) ns
| IT 
| 123Ag
| 
| 
| 
|-
| style="text-indent:1em" | 123m3Ag
| colspan="3" style="text-indent:2em" | 1472.8(8) keV
| 393(16) ns
| IT 
| 123Ag
| (17/2-)
| 
| 
|-
| rowspan=2|124Ag
| rowspan=2 style="text-align:right" | 47
| rowspan=2 style="text-align:right" | 77
| rowspan=2|123.92890(27)#
| rowspan=2|177.9(26) ms
| β− (98.7%)
| 124Cd
| rowspan=2|(2-)
| rowspan=2| 
| rowspan=2|
|-
| β−, n (1.3%)
| 123Cd
|-
| rowspan=2 style="text-indent:1em" | 124m1Ag
| rowspan=2 colspan="3" style="text-indent:2em" | 50(50)# keV
| rowspan=2|144(20) ms
| β−
| 124Cd
| rowspan=2|9-# 
| rowspan=2|
| rowspan=2|
|-
| β−, n
| 123Cd
|-
| style="text-indent:1em" | 124m2Ag
| colspan="3" style="text-indent:2em" | 155.6(5)# keV
| 140(50) ns
| IT
| 124Ag
| (1+)
| 
| 
|-
| style="text-indent:1em" | 124m3Ag
| colspan="3" style="text-indent:2em" | 231.1(7)# keV
| 1.48(15) μs
| IT
| 124Ag
| (1-)
| 
| 
|-
| rowspan=2|125Ag
| rowspan=2 style="text-align:right" | 47
| rowspan=2 style="text-align:right" | 78
| rowspan=2|124.93074(47)
| rowspan=2|160(5) ms
| β− (88.2%)
| 125Cd
| rowspan=2|(9/2+)
| rowspan=2|
| rowspan=2|
|-
| β−, n (11.8%)
| 124Cd
|-
| style="text-indent:1em" | 125m1Ag
| colspan="3" style="text-indent:2em" | 97.1(5)# keV
| 50# ms
| 
| 
| (1/2-)
| 
| 
|-
| style="text-indent:1em" | 125m2Ag
| colspan="3" style="text-indent:2em" | 97.1(5)# keV
| 491(20) ns
| 
| 
| (17/2-)
| 
| 
|-
| rowspan=2|126Ag
| rowspan=2 style="text-align:right" | 47
| rowspan=2 style="text-align:right" | 79
| rowspan=2|125.93481(22)#
| rowspan=2|52(10) ms
| β− (86.3%)
| 126Cd
| rowspan=2|3+#
| rowspan=2|
| rowspan=2|
|-
| β−, n (13.7%)
| 125Cd
|-
| style="text-indent:1em" | 126m1Ag
| colspan="3" style="text-indent:2em" | 100(100)# keV
| 108.4(24) ms
| 
| 
| 9-#
| 
| 
|-
| style="text-indent:1em" | 126m2Ag
| colspan="3" style="text-indent:2em" | 97.1(5)# keV
| 27(6) μs
| IT
| 126Ag
| 1-#
| 
| 
|-
| rowspan=2|127Ag
| rowspan=2 style="text-align:right" | 47
| rowspan=2 style="text-align:right" | 80
| rowspan=2|126.93704(22)#
| rowspan=2|89(2) ms
| β− (85.4%)
| 127Cd
| rowspan=2|(9/2+)
| rowspan=2|
| rowspan=2|
|-
| β−, n (14.6%)
| 126Cd
|-
| style="text-indent:1em" | 127m1Ag
| colspan="3" style="text-indent:2em" | 20(20)# keV
| 20# ms
| 
| 
| (1/2-)
| 
| 
|-
| rowspan=2 style="text-indent:1em" | 127m2Ag
| rowspan=2 colspan="3" style="text-indent:2em" | 1938(17) keV
| rowspan=2| 67.5(9) ms
| β− (91.2%)
| 127Cd
| rowspan=2| (27/2+)
| rowspan=2|
| rowspan=2|
|-
| IT (8.8%)
| 127Ag
|-
| rowspan=2| 128Ag
| rowspan=2 style="text-align:right" | 47
| rowspan=2 style="text-align:right" | 81
| rowspan=2| 127.94127(32)#
| rowspan=2| 60(3) ms
| β− (80%)
| 128Cd
| rowspan=2| 3+#
| rowspan=2|
| rowspan=2|
|-
| β−, n (20%)
| 127Cd
|-
| rowspan=2| 129Ag
| rowspan=2 style="text-align:right" | 47
| rowspan=2 style="text-align:right" | 82
| rowspan=2| 128.94432(43)#
| rowspan=2| 49.9(35) ms
| β− (>80%)
| 129Cd
| rowspan=2| 9/2+#
| rowspan=2|
| rowspan=2|
|-
| β−, n (<20%)
| 128Cd
|-
| style="text-indent:1em" | 129mAg
| colspan="3" style="text-indent:2em" | 20(20)# keV
| 10# ms
|
|
| 1/2−#
|
|
|-
| 130Ag
| style="text-align:right" | 47
| style="text-align:right" | 83
| 129.95073(46)#
| 40.6(45) ms
| β−
| 130Cd
| 1-#
|
|
|-
| rowspan=3| 131Ag
| rowspan=3 style="text-align:right" | 47
| rowspan=3 style="text-align:right" | 84
| rowspan=3| 130.95625(54)#
| rowspan=3| 35(8) ms
| β−
| 131Cd
| rowspan=3| 9/2+#
| rowspan=3|
| rowspan=3|
|-
| β−, n 
| 130Cd
|-
| β−, 2n 
| 129Cd
|-
| 132Ag
| style="text-align:right" | 47
| style="text-align:right" | 85
| 131.96307(54)#
| 30(14) ms
| β−
| 132Cd
| 6-#
|
|
|-
| 133Ag
| style="text-align:right" | 47
| style="text-align:right" | 86
|  132.96878(54)#
| 
| 
| 
| 6-#
|
|

References 

 Isotope masses from:

 Isotopic compositions and standard atomic masses from:

 Half-life, spin, and isomer data selected from the following sources.

 
Silver
Silver